The Yemen short-fingered gecko (Stenodactylus yemenensis) is a species of lizard in the family Gekkonidae. The species is found in Saudi Arabia and Yemen.

References

Stenodactylus
Reptiles described in 1980